French Only (released 2002 in Oslo, Norway by Bergland Production/Bare Bra Musikk – BE0062) is a Jazz album by the Norwegian Jazz band Urban Connection, also this time with Steinar Raknes compositions for the most.

Review 
French Only is the second album from this acclaimed Norwegian jazz trio. Their music is both hot and swingin', it is open and free, and it is melodic and lyrical. In fact it has so many facets to it as well imaginable for such an ensemble, and much of the credit must go to Steinar Raknes that once again have composed almost all the music, and thus has created a starting point full of challenges both for himself and his two musical companions.

Reception 
The review by the Norwegian newspaper Dagbladet awarded the album 5 stars (dice).

Track listing 
«Trick Book» (4:57)
«Tales Of Dr. Faustus» (6:48)
«Cricket Song, Part I» (3:26)
«Cricket Song, Part II» (3:16)
«Con Chord» (4:48)
«Hepburn Dance» (5:53)
«Greetings To Idris» (5:02)
«Manic Depression» (4:04)
«Snowdream» (4:12)

Credits 
Alto Saxophone - Frode Nymo
Bass – Steinar Raknes
Drums – Håkon Mjåset Johansen

References

External links 
Frode Nymo on Myspace
Håkon Mjåset Johansen on Myspace
Steinar Raknes Official Website

Urban Connection albums
2002 albums